The 357th Fighter Squadron is part of the 355th Fighter Wing at Davis–Monthan Air Force Base, Arizona.  It operates Fairchild Republic A-10 Thunderbolt II aircraft training pilots for close air support missions.

The squadron was first activated during World War II as a Republic P-47 Thunderbolt fighter squadron.  After training in the United States the unit deployed to the European Theater of Operations.  The unit entered combat operations in the summer of 1943, continuing in combat until April 1945.  It earned a Distinguished Unit Citation for carrying out a difficult attack in April 1944.  The squadron moved to Germany, where it was briefly part of the occupation forces before returning to the United States where it was inactivated in November 1945.

Mission
The 357th conducts all formal course directed aircraft transition, day and night weapons and tactics employment, day and night aerial refueling, and dissimilar air combat maneuvers.  The squadron trains pilots to plan, coordinate, execute, and control day and night close air support, air interdiction and battlefield surveillance and reconnaissance.

History

World War II

The 355th Fighter Squadron was first activated in late 1942 at Orlando Army Air Base, Florida as one of the original three squadrons of the 355th Fighter Group, flying Republic P-47 Thunderbolts.   The squadron trained under III Fighter Command in Florida and in the Middle Atlantic States, then was reassigned as part of I Fighter Command for final training at Philadelphia Municipal Airport, Pennsylvania.  The unit also performed air defense in the Philadelphia area in mid-1943.

The 357th deployed to the European Theater of Operations (ETO), where it became part of the 65th Fighter Wing of VIII Fighter Command, Eighth Air Force.  The squadron engaged in low-level sweeps over the low countries and Occupied France, attacking enemy airfields and targets of opportunity such as locomotives, bridges, radio stations, and armored cars.  Later the squadron served primarily as an escort for Boeing B-17 Flying Fortresses and Consolidated B-24 Liberator heavy bombers of VIII Bomber Command during missions into Germany.

On 5 April 1944, shortly after converting from P-47's to North American P-51 Mustangs, the squadron successfully bombed and strafed German airfields during a snow squall, for which it earned a Distinguished Unit Citation. It provided fighter cover for Allied forces landing in Normandy on 6 June 1944, and afterwards hit transportation facilities to cut enemy supply lines.  The unit hit fuel dumps, locomotives, and other targets in support of ground forces during the breakthrough at Saint-Lô in July.

The squadron remained in combat until 25 April 1945.  It moved to Occupied Germany as part of the United States Air Forces in Europe for occupation duty at AAF Station Gablingen, Germany, later moving to AAF Station Schweinfurt.  The squadron transferred, without personnel and equipment, to Mitchel Field New York on 1 August 1946.  It was inactivated on 20 November at Mitchel.

Cold War Air Defense

The squadron was reactivated as the 357th Fighter-Interceptor Squadron under Air Defense Command ADC at Portland International Airport, Oregon in November 1952.  The squadron took over the personnel, mission and North American F-86F Sabres of the federalized 123d Fighter-Interceptor Squadron of the Oregon Air National Guard which was returned to state control.  A little more than three months later, ADC formed Air Defense Groups at its dispersed fighter bases and the squadron became the operational element of the new 503d Air Defense Group.  However, the 503d soon converted to Lockheed F-94 Starfires with the activation of the 497th Fighter-Interceptor Squadron and the 357th deployed to Nouasseur Air Base, French Morocco and assigned to the 316th Air Division of United States Air Forces Europe in May, where it provided air defense mission for Strategic Air Command forward bases used by Boeing B-47 Stratojet aircraft on Reflex deployment to Morocco.  Th unit received new Mighty Mouse rocket armed and airborne intercept radar equipped North American F-86D Sabre interceptors in early 1955.  The unit remained in North Africa until 1960 when it was inactivated as SAC withdrew from its Morocco bases.

Viet Nam War

The 357th was reactivated in July 1962 at George Air Force Base, California as the 357th Tactical Fighter Squadron under the 355th Tactical Fighter Wing and equipped with Republic F-105 Thunderchiefs.  After a period of organization at George, the unit moved to McConnell Air Force Base, Kansas in mid-1964.

The squadron deployed for operations under the control of Pacific Air Forces (PACAF), initially operating temporarily from Yokota Air Base, Japan in the fall of 1964, then from Korat Royal Thai Air Force Base, Thailand in early 1965, flying combat missions over South Vietnam in support of the US Advisory forces and friendly South Vietnamese units, returning to McConnell in late 1965.   The unit almost immediately re-deployed to Thailand, this time to Takhli Royal Thai Air Force Base in early 1966 as part of the deployment of its parent wing, which became permanently assigned to PACAF's Thirteenth Air Force.

The squadron remained in Thailand engaged in combat operations over Indochina until 1970, flying frequent missions over enemy-held territory in South and North Vietnam.  Its combat actions earned it a Presidential Unit Citation and three Air Force Outstanding Unit Awards with Combat V. It was inactivated at Takhli on 10 December 1970 as part of the drawdown of US Forces in Southeast Asia in the early 1970s.

The squadron activated briefly at McConnell AFB in March 1971, but moved to Davis–Monthan Air Force Base, Arizona later that month and was reassigned to the reformed 355th Tactical Fighter Wing and equipped with the new LTV A-7D Corsair II ground support aircraft. It achieved operationally-ready status in 1972. In late 1972, the unit deployed its Corsairs to Korat RTAFB and was attached to the 354th Tactical Fighter Wing (Forward Echelon), which had deployed to Korat from Myrtle Beach AFB, South Carolina. From Korat, the squadron's aircraft conducted combat operations in South Vietnam, returning to Davis–Monthan in July 1973.

Post war era
The squadron was redesignated the 357th Tactical Fighter Training Squadron and taken off operational status in 1976, becoming an A-7D Pilot training squadron.   It received Fairchild Republic A-10A Thunderbolt IIs in 1979, the replacement for the A-7Ds, and became an A-10 Thunderbolt II Operational Training Unit, the mission the squadron currently performs.  In 2000, the squadron added the mission of training instructor pilots in the A-10.

Lineage
 Constituted as the 357th Fighter Squadron and activated on 12 November 1942
 Redesignated 357th Fighter Squadron, Single Engine on 20 August 1943
 Inactivated on 20 November 1946
 Redesignated 357th Fighter-Interceptor Squadron on 11 September 1952
 Activated on 1 November 1952
 Discontinued on 8 March 1960
 Redesignated 357th Tactical Fighter Squadron on 13 April 1962
 Organized on 8 July 1962
 Inactivated on 10 December 1970
 Activated on 15 March 1971a-10
 Redesignated: 357th Tactical Fighter Training Squadron on 1 July 1976
 Redesignated: 357th Fighter Squadron on 1 November 1991

Assignments
 355th Fighter Group, 12 November 1942 – 20 November 1946
 4704th Defense Wing, 1 November 1952
 503d Air Defense Group, 16 February 1953
 Seventeenth Air Force, 1 June 1953 (attached to Air Defense Division, Provisional, 8 June 1953 – 17 September 1953
 316th Air Division, 18 September 1953 – 8 March 1960
 Tactical Air Command, 13 April 1962 (not organized)
 355th Tactical Fighter Wing, 8 July 1962 (probably attached to 41st Air Division, 9 August 1964 – c. 9 December 1964 and to 6234th Tactical Fighter Wing, 12 June 1965 – 8 November 1965)
 835th Air Division, 8 November 1965 (attached to 23d Tactical Fighter Wing)
 355th Tactical Fighter Wing, 29 January 1966 – 10 December 1970
 23d Tactical Fighter Wing, 15 March 1971
 4453d Combat Crew Training Wing, 22 March 1971
 355th Tactical Fighter Wing (later, 355th Tactical Training wing; 355th Fighter) Wing), 1 July 1971
 355th Operations Group, 1 May 1992 – present

Stations

 Orlando Army Air Base, Florida, 12 November 1942
 Norfolk Municipal Airport, Virginia, 18 February 1943
 Langley Field, Virginia, 4 March 1943
 Millville Army Airfield, New Jersey, 27 April 1943
 Philadelphia Municipal Airport, Pennsylvania, 17 May 1943 – 16 June 1943
 RAF Steeple Morden (AAF-122), England, 8 July 1943
 AAF Station Gablingen (R-77), Germany, 17 July 1945
 AAF Station Schweinfurt (R-25), Germany, 15 April 1946
 Mitchel Field, New York, 1 August 1946 – 20 November 1946
 Portland International Airport (later Portland Air Force Base), Oregon, 1 November 1952 – 14 March 1953

 Nouasseur Air Base, French Morocco (later, Morocco), 28 May 1953 – 8 March 1960
 George Air Force Base, CA, 8 July 1962
 McConnell Air Force Base, KS, 21 July 1964 (deployed at Yokota Air Base, Japan, c. 9 August 1964 – c. 9 December- 1964 and at Korat Royal Thai Air Force Base, Thailand, c. 12 June 1965 – c. 8 November 1965)
 Takhli Royal Thai Air Force Base, Thailand, 29 January 1966 – 10 December 1970
 McConnell Air Force Base, Kansas, 15 March 1971
 Davis–Monthan Air Force Base, Arizona, 22 March 1971 – present

Aircraft
 Republic P-47 Thunderbolt (1943–1944)
 North American P-51 Mustang (1944–1946)
 North American F-86F Sabre (1952–1955)
 North American F-86D Sabre (1955–1960)
 Republic F-105 Thunderchief (1962–1970)
 McDonnell F-4 Phantom II (1971)
 LTV A-7 Corsair II (1971–1979)
 Fairchild Republic A-10 Thunderbolt II (1979 – present)

Awards and Campaigns

See also

References

Notes

Bibliography

 /
 
 
 
 
 USAF Aerospace Defense Command publication, The Interceptor, January 1979 (Volume 21, Number 1)

357
Military units and formations in Arizona
Fighter squadrons of the United States Army Air Forces